The following lists events that happened during 2006 in Cape Verde.

Incumbents
President: Pedro Pires
Prime Minister: José Maria Neves

Events
 January 22: Cape Verdean parliamentary election, 2006
 February 12: Cape Verdean presidential election, 2006
 November 21: University of Cape Verde established

Arts and entertainment
Batuque, the Soul of a People documentary film released
Mayra Andrade's album Navega released
March 6: Cesária Évora's 12th album Rogamar was released

Sports

Sporting Clube da Praia won the Cape Verdean Football Championship

Deaths
Sérgio Ferreira (b. 1946), writer

References

 
Years of the 21st century in Cape Verde
2000s in Cape Verde
Cape Verde
Cape Verde